Lars Øvrebø (born 15 July 1984) is a Norwegian football midfielder.

He started his career at Vålerenga IF. He got one Norwegian Premier League game in 2002 and seven in 2004. He left after the 2004 season, and joined Drøbak/Frogn IF in the summer of 2005. In the latter part of the 2006 season he was loaned by Moss FK. After the 2006 season he signed a permanent contract. After the 2009 season he went on to Drøbak/Frogn, then played on a lower level with Lille Tøyen FK.

References

1984 births
Living people
Footballers from Oslo
Norwegian footballers
Vålerenga Fotball players
Drøbak-Frogn IL players
Moss FK players
Eliteserien players
Norwegian First Division players

Association football midfielders